The Wannabe is a 2015 American drama film written and directed by Nick Sandow, with Martin Scorsese as an executive producer, and starring Patricia Arquette, David Zayas, Domenick Lombardozzi, Michael Imperioli, Vincent Piazza and Nick Sandow. It was released on December 4, 2015, by Orion Pictures and Momentum Pictures

Cast
 Vincent Piazza as Thomas
 Patricia Arquette as Rose
 Michael Imperioli as Alphonse
 David Zayas
 Domenick Lombardozzi as Mickey
 Nick Sandow as Anthony 
 Mike Starr 		
 Doug E. Doug as The Twin
 Vincenzo Amato as Richie
 Slaine 		
 Larry Eudene as Assistant DA
 Joseph Siravo as John Gotti
 Neal Huff
 Mark Lotito as Prosecutor Maloney
 Adriana DeMeo as Annie
 Daniel Sauli as Curtis Sliwa
 Mario Macaluso as Whitey
 Jay Bulger as Eric Roberts
 Mark Vincent as Eddie Lino
 Joe Bevilacqua as Giuseppe

Production
Nick Sandow was inspired to write the film after reading about Thomas and Rosemarie Uva, a New York City couple who were murdered on Christmas Eve 1992 by the New York mafia after they had robbed several mafia social clubs over the prior few months. After Sandow worked with his Boardwalk Empire co-star Vincent Piazza on the script, the pair sent the script to Boardwalk Empire executive producer Martin Scorsese. Sandow told Creative Screenwriting, "When we felt comfortable about the script, we thought about trying to get it to Marty. He sent it to him with a bottle of wine before the holidays. We didn’t have expectations, but after the holidays they were having a table read for the first episode of the next season of Boardwalk Empire and Marty came up to him and said he loved The Wannabe." Scorsese agreed to serve as executive producer of the film.

Release
The film premiered at the Tribeca Film Festival on April 17, 2015. On May 18, 2015, Entertainment One Films acquired the film. It was released on December 4, 2015, by Entertainment One Films.

Reception 
On review aggregator Rotten Tomatoes the film holds a "Rotten" 38% rating based on eight reviews, with an average rating of 3.5/10. On Metacritic, the film has a weighted average score of 49 out of 100, based on seven critics, indicating "mixed or average reviews".

Ronnie Scheib of Variety called the film a "conventional mob drama" but praised the performances.

References

External links
 

2015 films
Films about the American Mafia
American drama films
2015 drama films
2010s English-language films
2010s American films